Nauru elects on a national level a head of state (the president) and a legislature. Parliament has 19 members (increased from 18 for the 2013 election), elected for a three-year term in multi-seat constituencies. The president is elected for a three-year term by the parliament.

However, there are frequent changes of government in Nauru which occur without an election; most recently, in December 2007, that of President of Nauru Marcus Stephen came to office following a Parliamentary vote of no confidence which overturned the preceding Administration of Ludwig Scotty, reelected just a few weeks previously with a landslide majority.

Voting system
The 19 seat members of the Parliament of Nauru are elected through the Dowdall System, a decimalised modification of a preferential Borda count. The voter must rank all candidates in order of preference (see preferential voting). Each vote is then counted using the formula 1/n, according to ranking order. For example, a candidate ranked first receives one point, the second candidate receives half a point, the third candidate receives a third of a point, and so on. Each legal vote is aggregated in order to determine a decimal score for each candidate. For example, in the June 2010 Nauruan parliamentary election the then president Marcus Stephen regained his Anetan Constituency seat after receiving 349.617 decimal votes from a total of 630 votes.

Latest elections

See also
 Electoral calendar
 Electoral system

References

External links
Adam Carr's Election Archive
  Maximiliano Herrera Electoral Calendar